Tyrese Demola Huxley Omotoye (born 23 September 2002) is a Belgian professional footballer who plays as a forward for  club Forest Green Rovers.

Club career
Omotoye played for Cray Wanderers before joining Norwich City. On 17 October 2019, he signed his first professional contract with Norwich City. On 7 October 2020, he scored a hat-trick for the under-21 side in a 5–0 win over Newport County in the EFL Trophy. On 2 December 2020, Omotoye made his professional debut for Norwich City, coming on as a substitute in a 3–1 loss to Luton Town. In January 2021, Omotoye signed on loan at Swindon Town in League One for the remainder of the 2020–21 season. In August 2021, he joined League Two side Leyton Orient on a season-long loan deal. On 5 January 2022, Omotoye joined Carlisle United on loan until the end of the season following his recall from Leyton Orient. On 23 January 2023, Omotoye joined Forest Green Rovers on a permanent deal.

International career
Omotoye has represented Belgium at under-16 level, playing in friendlies against Portugal and Ukraine in November 2017.

Personal life
Omotoye was born in Belgium to Nigerian parents but raised in England. In 2019, he decided that Nigeria was the country he wanted to play international football for.

Career statistics

References

2002 births
Living people
Belgian footballers
Association football forwards
Belgian people of Nigerian descent
Belgium youth international footballers
Black Belgian sportspeople
Norwich City F.C. players
Swindon Town F.C. players
Leyton Orient F.C. players
Carlisle United F.C. players
English Football League players
Belgian expatriate footballers
Expatriate footballers in England
Belgian expatriate sportspeople in England